Rok Puhar (born 14 September 1992) is a Slovenian long distance runner. He competed in the men's marathon at the 2017 World Championships in Athletics. In 2018, he competed in the men's half marathon at the 2018 IAAF World Half Marathon Championships held in Valencia, Spain. He did not finish his race.

References

External links

1992 births
Living people
Slovenian male long-distance runners
Slovenian male marathon runners
World Athletics Championships athletes for Slovenia
Place of birth missing (living people)